Voksenlia is a station on the Holmenkollen Line (Line 1) of the Oslo Metro. It is between Skogen and Holmenkollen. The station was opened on 16 May 1916 when the tramway was extended to Frognerseteren. The station was originally called Lia.

References

Oslo Metro stations in Oslo
Railway stations opened in 1916
1916 establishments in Norway